Pachygnatha tullgreni is a spider species found in Portugal.

See also
 List of Tetragnathidae species

References

External links

Tetragnathidae
Spiders of Europe
Spiders described in 1973